The women's K-2 500 metres competition at the 2022 ICF Canoe Sprint World Championships in Dartmouth took place on Lake Banook.

Schedule
The schedule is as follows:

Results

Heats
The fastest boat in each heat advanced directly to the final.The next six fastest boats in each heat advanced to the semifinals.

Heat 1

Heat 2

Heat 3

Semifinals
The fastest three boats in each semi advanced to the A final.The next four fastest boats in each semi, plus the fastest remaining boat advanced to the B final.

Semifinal 1

Semifinal 2

Finals

Final B
Competitors in this final raced for positions 10 to 18.

Final A
Competitors in this final raced for positions 1 to 9, with medals going to the top three.

References

ICF